El amor después del amor  (Love After Love), is the eighth studio album by Argentine musician Fito Páez, released in 1992. El Amor Después del Amor marked the pinnacle of his commercial success, also becoming the most sold album in the history of Argentine rock. In 2007, the Argentine edition of Rolling Stone ranked it 13 on its list of "The 100 Greatest Albums of National Rock".

Track listing
All songs credited to Fito Páez; "La Rueda Mágica" co-credited to Charly García.

In popular culture

Cover versions
"A rodar mi vida" was covered by the cast of Disney Channel's Argentine TV series Soy Luna.

In other media
"El Amor Después Del Amor" was part of the soundtrack of the 1998 Peruvian film No se lo digas a nadie.

Chart performance

Personnel
Performing 
 Fito Páez (vocals, piano, guitar and keyboards)
 Tweety Gonzalez (organ and programming)
 Ulises Butrón : (guitars)
 Guillermo Vadalá : (bass and guitar in "La Rueda Mágica")
 Daniel Colombes: (percussion)

Guest musicians 
 Mercedes Sosa: (vocals on "Detrás Del Muro De Los Lamentos")
 Luis Alberto Spinetta: (vocals, arrangements and guitar on "Pétalo De Sal")
 Charly García: (vocals on "La Rueda Mágica")
 Andrés Calamaro: (vocals on "La Rueda Mágica" and "Brillante Sobre El Mic")
 Fabiana Cantilo: (vocals on "Dos Días En La Vida" and "Brillante Sobre El Mic")
 Celeste Carballo: (vocals on "Dos Días En La Vida")
 Claudia Puyó: (vocals on "El Amor Después Del Amor")
 Fabian Gallardo: (vocals on "Dos Días En La Vida")
 Osvaldo Fattoruso (percussion)
 Daniel Melingo: (clarinet on "Sasha, Sissí Y El Círculo De Baba")
 Ariel Rot: (lead guitar on "A Rodar Mi Vida")
 Gabriel Carámbula: (guitars on "Brillante Sobre El Mic")
 Antonio Carmona (vocals on "Tráfico Por Katmandú", cajón y palmas en "Detrás Del Muro De Los Lamentos")
 Chucho Marchand: (bass on "Detrás Del Muro De Los Lamentos")
 Chango Farías Gómez: (cajon on "Detrás Del Muro De Los Lamentos")
 Lucho Gonzalez (guitar and arrangements on "Detrás Del Muro De Los Lamentos")
 Carlos Narea : (claps on "Detrás del Muro de los Lamentos")
 Carlos Villavicencio (arrangement and conduction of strings and brasses). Performed by The Gavin Wright's Orchestra, London.

Sales and certifications

References

External links
 Fito Páez - Terra Música 
 Review about the album - Fito Páez Biography (4/5) on YouTube 

1992 albums
Fito Páez albums